The Impressions is the debut album by the American soul music group of the same name. It produced six chart hit singles, including their biggest hit, the Billboard top ten pop smash "It's All Right", and the top 20 hit, "Gypsy Woman". After the departure of original Impressions lead singer Jerry Butler to a successful solo career, the other original members, brothers Arthur and Richard Brooks also left. The remaining original members, Curtis Mayfield, Sam Gooden and Fred Cash, chose not to replace them. Instead, they scaled down to a trio, and went on to become one of America's top R&B vocal groups.

Track listing
All tracks composed by Curtis Mayfield; except where indicated
"It's All Right" - 2:49
"Gypsy Woman" - 2:20
"Grow Closer Together" - 2:12
"Little Young Lover" - 2:14
"You've Come Home" - 2:45
"Never Let Me Go" (Joseph Scott) - 2:30
"Minstrel and Queen (Queen Majesty)" - 2:22
"I Need Your Love" (Richard Brooks) - 2:25
"I'm the One Who Loves You" - 2:28
"Sad, Sad Girl and Boy" - 2:40
"As Long as You Love Me" - 2:27
"Twist and Limbo" - 2:29

Personnel
The Impressions
Curtis Mayfield – lead vocals, guitar
Fred Cash – backing vocals
Sam Gooden – backing vocals
The Funk Brothers – instrumentation

Charts
USA - Album

USA - Singles

References

1963 debut albums
The Impressions albums
Albums produced by Curtis Mayfield
ABC Records albums